Secrets of the Orient is a 1928 German-French silent drama film directed by Alexandre Volkoff and starring Nikolas Kolin, Iván Petrovich and Dimitri Dimitriev. It was made at the Babelsberg Studios in Berlin while Location shooting took place in Nice and French Tunisia. The film's sets were designed by the art directors Alexandre Lochakoff and Vladimir Meingard.

Cast
 Nikolas Kolin as Ali, shoemaker in Cairo
 Iván Petrovich as Prince Achmed
 Dimitri Dimitriev as Sultan Schariah
 Gaston Modot as Prince Hussein
 Julius Falkenstein as Astrologer
 Hermann Picha as Sultan's fool
 Aleksandr Vertinsky as Vezir
 Marcella Albani as Sobeide, Sultan's favorite
 Agnes Petersen-Mozzuchinowa as Princess Gylnare, daughter of Sultan
 Nina Koshetz as Fatme, wife of Ali
 Dita Parlo as Slave of the Princess
 Brigitte Helm
 Steffie Vida

References

Bibliography
 Bock, Hans-Michael. Das Ufa-Buch. Zweitausendeins, 1992.

External links

1928 films
Films of the Weimar Republic
1928 drama films
German silent feature films
German drama films
French silent feature films
French drama films
Films directed by Alexandre Volkoff
Films set in Egypt
UFA GmbH films
Cine-Allianz films
German black-and-white films
Silent drama films
1920s German films
1920s French films
Films shot at Babelsberg Studios
1920s German-language films
German-language French films